The Border is a 2009 Slovak documentary film directed by Jaroslav Vojtek. The film was selected as the Slovak entry for the Best Foreign Language Film at the 83rd Academy Awards but did not make the final shortlist.

See also
 List of submissions to the 83rd Academy Awards for Best Foreign Language Film
 List of Slovak submissions for the Academy Award for Best Foreign Language Film

References

External links

2009 films
Slovak-language films
2009 documentary films
Slovak documentary films